Frederic Leighton, 1st Baron Leighton,  (3 December 1830 – 25 January 1896), known as Sir Frederic Leighton between 1878 and 1896, was a British painter, draughtsman, and sculptor. His works depicted historical, biblical, and classical subject matter in an academic style. His paintings were enormously popular, and expensive, during his lifetime, but fell out of critical favour for many decades in the early 20th century.

Leighton was the bearer of the shortest-lived peerage in history; after only one day his hereditary peerage became extinct upon his death.

Biography

Leighton was born in Scarborough to Augusta Susan and Dr. Frederic Septimus Leighton (1799–1892), a medical doctor. Leighton's grandfather, Sir James Boniface Leighton (1769–1843), had been the primary physician to two Russian tsars - Alexander I and Nicholas I - and their families, and amassed a fortune while in their service. Leighton’s career was always cushioned by this family wealth, with his father paying him an allowance throughout his life. He had two sisters, one of them being Alexandra who was Robert Browning's biographer. He was educated at University College School, London. He then received his artistic training on the European continent, first from Eduard von Steinle and then from Giovanni Costa. At age 17, in the summer of 1847, he met the philosopher Arthur Schopenhauer in Frankfurt and drew his portrait, in graphite and gouache on paper — the only known full-length study of Schopenhauer done from life. When he was 24 he was in Florence; he studied at the Accademia di Belle Arti, and painted the procession of the Cimabue Madonna through the Borgo Allegri. From 1855 to 1859 he lived in Paris, where he met Ingres, Delacroix, Corot and Millet.

Travel was an important part of Leighton’s life from childhood.  By his late teens, he was living with his family in Frankfurt, Germany and had already visited many of Europe’s major cities, including Florence and Rome; places which he would return to on a great many occasions over the next decades. By his late twenties, extended periods had been spent living in Rome and then Paris and Leighton had made his first trip outside Europe, travelling to north Africa in 1857.  Once settled in London, he continued to make extensive trips on an annual basis until shortly before his death. The countries that Leighton visited on at least one occasion include Austria, Algeria, Egypt, France, Germany, Greece, Ireland, Italy, Lebanon, Morocco, The Netherlands, Scotland, Spain, Switzerland, Syria and Turkey.

In 1860, he moved to London, where he associated with the Pre-Raphaelites. He designed Elizabeth Barrett Browning's tomb for Robert Browning in the English Cemetery, Florence in 1861. In 1864 he became an associate of the Royal Academy and in 1878 he became its President (1878–96).  His 1877 sculpture, Athlete Wrestling with a Python, was considered at its time to inaugurate a renaissance in contemporary British sculpture, referred to as the New Sculpture. American art critic Earl Shinn claimed at the time that "Except Leighton, there is scarce any one capable of putting up a correct frescoed figure in the archway of the Kensington Museum." His paintings represented Britain at the great 1900 Paris Exhibition.  

He was the first President of the Committee commissioning the Survey of London which documented the capital's principal buildings and public art.

Leighton was knighted at Windsor in 1878, and was created a baronet, of Holland Park Road in the Parish of St Mary Abbots, Kensington, in the County of Middlesex, eight years later. He was the first painter to be given a peerage, in the 1896 New Year Honours. The patent creating him Baron Leighton, of Stretton in the County of Shropshire, was issued on 24 January 1896; Leighton died the next day of angina pectoris.

Leighton remained a bachelor; rumours of him having an illegitimate child with one of his models, in addition to the supposition that Leighton may have been a homosexual, continue to be debated. He certainly enjoyed an intense and romantically tinged relationship with the poet Henry William Greville whom he met in Florence in 1856. The older man showered Leighton in letters, but the romantic affection seems not to have been reciprocated. Enquiry is furthermore hindered by the fact that Leighton left no diaries and his letters lack reference to his personal circumstances. No definite primary evidence has yet come to light that effectively dispels the secrecy that Leighton built up around himself, although it is clear that he did court a circle of younger men around his artistic studio.

On his death his barony was extinguished after existing for only a day; this is a record in the Peerage. His house in Holland Park, London has been turned into a museum, the Leighton House Museum. It contains many of his drawings and paintings, as well as some of his former art collection including works by Old Masters and his contemporaries such as a painting dedicated to Leighton by Sir John Everett Millais. The house also features many of Leighton's inspirations, including his collection of Iznik tiles. Its centrepiece is the magnificent Arab Hall. The Hall is featured in issue ten of Cornucopia.
A blue plaque commemorates Leighton at Leighton House Museum.

Artists Rifles

Leighton was an enthusiastic volunteer soldier, enrolling with the first group to join the 38th Middlesex (Artists') Rifle Volunteer Corps (later to be known as the Artists Rifles) on 5 October 1860.

His qualities of leadership were immediately identified, and he was promoted to command a Company within a few months. On 6 January 1869 Captain Leighton was elected to command the Artists Rifles by a general meeting of the corps. In the same year he was promoted to major and in 1875 to lieutenant colonel. Leighton resigned as commanding officer in 1883. The painter James Whistler famously described the then Sir Frederic Leighton, the commanding officer of the Artists Rifles, as the: "Colonel of the Royal Academy and the President of the Artists Rifles – aye, and he paints a little!" At his funeral, on 3 February 1896, his coffin was carried into St Paul's Cathedral, past a guard of honour formed by the Artists Rifles.

Honours 
 1864: Associate of the Royal Academy
 1868: Royal Academy Academician
 1878: President of the Royal Academy
 1878: Légion d'honneur Officer
 1878: Knight Bachelor
 1886: Created a baronet in the Baronetage of the United Kingdom
 1889: Associate member of the Institute of France
 1896: Created a baron in the Peerage of the United Kingdom

Selected works
 Death of Brunelleschi (1852), oil on canvas
 The Fisherman and the Siren, c. 1856–58 (66.3 × 48.7 cm)
 Cimabue's Celebrated Madonna Is Carried in Procession Through the Streets of Florence (1853–55), oil on canvas.
 The Discovery of Juliet Apparently Lifeless (c.1858)
 The Villa Malta, Rome (1860s), oil on canvas
 The Painter's Honeymoon, c. 1864 (83.8 × 77.5 cm)
 Mother and Child, c. 1865, (48.2 × 82 cm)
 Actaea, the Nymph of the Shore  (1868), oil on canvas, (57.2 × 102.2 cm) National Gallery of Canada, Ottawa.
 Daedalus and Icarus, c. 1869, (138.2 × 106.5 cm)
 Hercules Wrestling with Death for the Body of Alcestis (1869–71) (132.4 × 265.4 cm)
 After Vespers 1871, (111.5 × 71.5 cm), Princeton University Art Museum
 Greek Girls Picking up Pebbles by the Sea, 1871 (84 × 129.5 cm)
 Teresina  (c. 1874) Christchurch Art Gallery Te Puna o Waiwhetu, Christchurch, New Zealand
 Music Lesson, c. 1877, (92.8 × 118.1 cm)
 An Athlete Wrestling with a Python  (1877), bronze sculpture
 Nausicaa, c. 1878 (145 × 67 cm)
 Winding the Skein, c. 1878, (100.3 × 161.3 cm)
 Light of the Harem, c. 1880, (152.4 × 83.8 cm)
 Idyll, c. 1880–81
 Wedded, (c. 1881–1882) (145.4 × 81 cm)
 Cymon and Iphigenia (1884) Art Gallery of New South Wales
 Captive Andromache, c. 1888 (197 × 406.5 cm)
 The Bath of Psyche, (c. 1889–90) (189.2 × 62.2 cm) Tate Gallery
 The Garden of the Hesperides, c. 1892, (169 × 169 cm), Lady Lever Art Gallery
 Flaming June (1895), oil on canvas, Museo de Arte de Ponce, Puerto Rico (120.6 × 120.6 cm)
 The Parable of the Wise and Foolish Virgins (Fresco)
 The armlet
 Phoebe (55.88 × 60.96 cm)
 A Bather
 The Leighton Frescoes, The Arts of Industry as Applied to War and The Arts of Industry as Applied to Peace
 Phoenicians Trading with the Early Britons on the Coast of Cornwall, 1895. Mural at the Royal Exchange, London
 The Return of Persephone 1891, oil on canvas, Leeds Art Gallery

Gallery

See also
 Romola – the 1863 novel by George Eliot for which Leighton did the illustrations

Citations

General references

External links

 Frederic-Leighton.org—114 works by Frederic Leighton
 Advice to Young Artists by Frederick Lord Leighton—high resolution images
 Scarborough, Birthplace of Lord Frederic Leighton
 Leighton House Museum
 Obituary from The Times
 Leighton Gallery  at MuseumSyndicate
  
 Portrait of Sir Frederick Leighton, PRA by Alphonse Legros at University of Michigan Museum of Art

1830 births
1896 deaths
Barons in the Peerage of the United Kingdom
English sculptors
English male sculptors
History painters
People of the Victorian era
Prix de Rome for painting
People from Scarborough, North Yorkshire
Royal Academicians
People educated at University College School
Knights Bachelor
Artists' Rifles officers
Academic art
Officiers of the Légion d'honneur
Recipients of the Royal Gold Medal
Recipients of the Pour le Mérite (civil class)
Pre-Raphaelite painters
19th-century British sculptors
19th-century English painters
Orientalist painters
English male painters
Peers of the United Kingdom created by Queen Victoria
Pre-Raphaelite sculptors